Serhiy Konyushenko  (born 9 July 1971 in Kyiv, Ukrainian SSR, Soviet Union) is a former Ukrainian professional football defender and current Ukrainian coach.

In November 2011, Konyushenko was appointed as interim coach to the Ukrainian Premier League club FC Obolon Kyiv after working during the long time as assistant coach in this club. FC Obolon Kyiv dissolved itself in February 2013. On 20 June 2016 he was appointed the head coach for Toronto Atomic FC B in the Canadian Soccer League.

References

External links
 Profile at Official FFU Site (Ukr)

1971 births
Living people
Footballers from Kyiv
Ukrainian footballers
FC Nyva Myronivka players
FC Oleksandriya players
FC Obolon-Brovar Kyiv players
FC Obolon-2 Kyiv players
Ukrainian Premier League players
Association football defenders
Ukrainian football managers
Ukrainian Premier League managers
FC Obolon Kyiv managers
SC Chaika Petropavlivska Borshchahivka managers
Canadian Soccer League (1998–present) managers